Anoba sinuata is a moth of the family Noctuidae. It is found in India, Sri Lanka, Ghana, Kenya, South Africa. Caterpillars are known to feed on Abrus precatorius.

References

Moths of Asia
Moths of Africa
Moths described in 1775
Taxa named by Johan Christian Fabricius